In mathematics, a harmonic divisor number, or Ore number (named after Øystein Ore who defined it in 1948), is a positive integer whose divisors have a harmonic mean that is an integer. The first few harmonic divisor numbers are:

1, 6, 28, 140, 270, 496, 672, 1638, 2970, 6200, 8128, 8190 .

Examples
For example, the harmonic divisor number 6 has the four divisors 1, 2, 3, and 6. Their harmonic mean is an integer:

The number 140 has divisors 1, 2, 4, 5, 7, 10, 14, 20, 28, 35, 70, and 140. Their harmonic mean is:

5 is an integer, making 140 a harmonic divisor number.

Factorization of the harmonic mean
The harmonic mean  of the divisors of any number  can be expressed as the formula

All of the terms in this formula are multiplicative, but not completely multiplicative.
Therefore, the harmonic mean  is also multiplicative.

For instance, we have

and

Harmonic divisor numbers and perfect numbers 

For any integer M, as Ore observed, the product of the harmonic mean and arithmetic mean of its divisors equals M itself, as can be seen from the definitions. Therefore, M is harmonic, with harmonic mean of divisors k, if and only if the average of its divisors is the product of M with a unit fraction 1/k.

Ore showed that every perfect number is harmonic. To see this, observe that the sum of the divisors of a perfect number M is exactly 2M; therefore, the average of the divisors is M(2/τ(M)), where τ(M) denotes the number of divisors of M. For any M, τ(M) is odd if and only if M is a square number, for otherwise each divisor d of M can be paired with a different divisor M/d. But, no perfect number can be a square: this follows from the known form of even perfect numbers and from the fact that odd perfect numbers (if they exist) must have a factor of the form qα where α ≡ 1 (mod 4). Therefore, for a perfect number M, τ(M) is even and the average of the divisors is the product of M with the unit fraction 2/τ(M); thus, M is a harmonic divisor number.

Ore conjectured that no odd harmonic divisor numbers exist other than 1. If the conjecture is true, this would imply the nonexistence of odd perfect numbers.

Bounds and computer searches 

W. H. Mills (unpublished; see Muskat) showed that any odd harmonic divisor number above 1 must have a prime power factor greater than 107, and Cohen showed that any such number must have at least three different prime factors.  showed that there are no odd harmonic divisor numbers smaller than 1024.

Cohen, Goto, and others starting with Ore himself have performed computer searches listing all small harmonic divisor numbers. From these results, lists are known of all harmonic divisor numbers up to 2 × 109, and all harmonic divisor numbers for which the harmonic mean of the divisors is at most 300.

References 

 

 

Divisor function
Integer sequences
Number theory
Perfect numbers